October Faction is an American supernatural drama streaming television series created by Damian Kindler, based on the comic series of the same name by Steve Niles and Damien Worm. It premiered on Netflix on January 23, 2020. The series stars Tamara Taylor, J. C. MacKenzie, Aurora Dawson-Hunte, Gabriel Darku, Wendy Crewson, Megan Follows and Stephen McHattie. In March 2020, the series was canceled after one season.

Synopsis
October Faction follows the story of a monster-hunting couple, Fred and Deloris Allen, and their twin teenage children, Geoff and Viv. Following the death of Fred's father Samuel, the family decides to go back to their home town Barrington-on-Hudson, in New York, to arrange the funeral. Haunted with childhood memories of his brother's death and the incessant arguments with his parents over his inadequacy and his choice in women, Fred is repulsed by his childhood home. The children soon begin showing supernatural tendencies. During an impromptu seance Viv has visions of a creature with long hair chained to the seafloor, struggling to free itself. Her brother Geoff accidentally reveals a teacher's deepest, darkest secret about his wife in front of his classmates. Both are ridiculed by the popular cliques for being outsiders.

Fred and Deloris are members of Presidio, a secret organisation tasked to protect humanity from various breeds of monsters. They must hide their identities from the townsfolk and appear to live a normal life. This proves hard from the start as strange things begin to unfold in the sleepy little town.

Cast

Main

Tamara Taylor as Deloris Allen, a supernatural hunter who is part of a secret organization known as "Presidio"
J. C. MacKenzie as Fred Allen, Deloris' husband and a fellow Presidio supernatural hunter who came from a family of Presidio supernatural hunters
Aurora Dawson-Hunte as Viv Allen, Deloris and Fred's teenage daughter
Gabriel Darku as Geoff Allen, Deloris and Fred's openly gay teenage son and Viv's twin
Maxim Roy as Alice Harlow, a murderous warlock hunting the Allens after she caused the deaths of her own family and friends, Viv and Geoff's natural mother
Stephen McHattie as Samuel Allen, Fred's father who is thought dead, but is a prisoner of Presidio
Wendy Crewson as Maggie Allen, Fred's mother and a retired Presidio archivist
Megan Follows as Edith Mooreland, the head of Presidio

Recurring
Anwen O'Driscoll as Cathy MacDonald, Viv's potential friend who betrays her trust first chance she gets
Nicola Correia-Damude as Gina Fernandez, the local sheriff of Barrington-on-Hudson and Deloris' friend
 Sara Waisglass as Madison St. Claire, a bully to Viv and Cathy's former friend
 Praneet Akilla as Phillip Mishra, a closeted jock and initially a bully to Geoff
Michelle Nolden as Hannah Mercer, a Presidio agent and Fred's mistress
Dayo Ade as Moshe, a werewolf who forms a grudging friendship with Fred and Deloris, and later with the Barrington sheriff department
Robin Dunne as Woody Markham, a deputy sheriff of Barrington-on-Hudson
 Charles Vandervaart as young Fred
 Taveeta Szymanowicz as young Deloris

Episodes

Production

Development
On September 28, 2018, it was announced that Netflix had given the production a series order for a first season consisting of ten episodes. Damian Kindler, Director X, Megan Follows, Mina Shum, and David Frazee are set to direct some episodes. The series was created by Damian Kindler who will also act as writer and executive producer. Additional executive producers are set to include James Thorpe, Steve Niles, Thomas Walden, Eric Birnberg, George Strayton and Melissa Blake. Production companies involved with the series include High Park Entertainment and IDW Entertainment. On March 30, 2020, Netflix cancelled the series after one season.

Casting
Sometime after the series order announcement, it was confirmed that Tamara Taylor, J.C. MacKenzie, Aurora Burghart, Gabriel Darku, Wendy Crewson, Megan Follows and Stephen McHattie would star in the series. In October 2018, Maxim Roy  was cast in a recurring role.

Filming
Filming for the first season took place on location in Cambridge, Ontario from September to December 2018.

Release

On January 8, 2020, Netflix released the official trailer for the series.

Reception

On Rotten Tomatoes, the series holds an approval rating of 29% with an average rating of 5.5/10, based on 7 reviews.

References

External links

2020s American drama television series
2020 American television series debuts
2020 American television series endings
2020s American horror television series
2020s American science fiction television series
2020s American supernatural television series
American action television series
American science fiction web series
Dark fantasy television series
Dark fantasy web series
English-language Netflix original programming
Science fiction horror web series
Serial drama television series
Thriller television series
Television shows based on comics
IDW Publishing adaptations
Television series about dysfunctional families
Television series about teenagers
Cambridge, Ontario
Television shows filmed in Toronto
Television shows set in New York (state)
Witchcraft in television